{{Infobox television
| image              = Mu Huckleberry Friends drama poster.jpg
| caption            =
| alt_name           = 
| genre              = RomanceComing-of-age
| based_on           =  Hello, Old Times by Ba Yue Chang An
| writer             = 
| director           = Sha Mo
| starring           = Li LandiZhang Xincheng
| voices             = 
| opentheme          = My Light (我的光) - Huang Yali
| endtheme           = 'The Right to Choose (遥远的歌) - Liu Xijun
| composer           = 
| country            = China
| language           = Mandarin
| num_seasons        = 1
| num_episodes       = 30
| runtime            = 45 minutes
| executive_producer = Dai Ying
| editor             = 
| location           = Qingdao
| cinematography     = 
| company            = iQiyi, Sugar Man Media, HS Entertainment
| channel            = iQiyi
| picture_format     = 
| audio_format       = 
| first_aired        = 
| last_aired         =
| related            = With You Unrequited Love| image_size         = 210 
}}My Huckleberry Friends is a 2017 Chinese streaming television series based on the novel Hello, Old Times  (你好，旧时光) by Ba Yue Chang An (八月长安). It stars Li Landi and Zhang Xincheng in lead. It aired on iQiyi from 8 November 2017.

Synopsis
This series follows Yu Zhou Zhou, a math prodigy, who defies her teachers and family's expectations and elects to study liberal arts; and Lin Yang, a friend she really treasures but grew apart from due to rumors and reconcile.

Cast
Li Landi as Yu Zhou Zhou
Zhang Xincheng as Lin Yang 
Zhou Chengao as Ben Ben
Li Qian as Mi Qiao
Xu Meng Yuan as Xin Rui
Cao En Qi as Chen An
Tang Meng Jia as Ling Xiang Qian 
Zhao Jian Lei as Jiang Chuan
Chen Peng Wan Li as Chu Tian Guo

Soundtrack

Reception
The series was praised for incorporating family, kinship, friendship and romance; and showing timeline of growth to fully showcase a picture of youth.

Awards and nominations

SequelMy Huckleberry Friends is the second installment of a youth series written by Bayue Changan, following With You and before Unrequited Love.

References

External links
 My Huckleberry Friends'' on Sina Weibo

2010s high school television series
2010s teen drama television series
IQIYI original programming
Chinese web series
Chinese high school television series
2017 Chinese television series debuts
2017 web series debuts
Television series about teenagers